Paper, Scissors, Stone  may refer to:
Rock paper scissors, a hand game
Nemesis Game, a film directed and written by Jesse Warn called Paper, Scissors, Stone in Canada
Paper Scissors Stone (album), an album by Welsh band Catatonia